The Seetal is a valley in the cantons of Lucerne and Aargau in Switzerland. The valley descends from south to north from near Eschenbach (in the canton of Lucerne) to Lenzburg (in the canton of Aargau), and is drained by the Aabach and the Ron. The valley is distinguished by Lake Hallwil and Lake Baldegg, from which it takes its name (Lake Valley).

Communities 
The following municipalities lie within the Seetal:

 Aesch, Altwis
 Ballwil, Beinwil am See, Birrwil, Boniswil
 Dürrenäsch
 Egliswil, Ermensee, Eschenbach
 Fahrwangen
 Hallwil, Hitzkirch, Hochdorf, Hohenrain
 Leutwil
 Meisterschwanden
 Römerswil
 Seengen, Seon, Schongau

Transport 
The valley is followed throughout its length by the Seetalstrasse main road and by the Seetal railway line, which both serve to link Lucerne and Lenzburg. The railway line closely parallels the road, with many of the characteristics of a roadside tramway, and stations serve many of the villages of the valley.

References 

Valleys of Switzerland
Landforms of the canton of Lucerne
Landforms of Aargau